Invalidovna (French "hôtel des invalides") is a building in Karlín, a district of Prague.

Invalidovna was built from 1731-1737 as a dormitory for war invalids (veterans) by Kilián Ignác Dienzenhofer. Its model was Les Invalides, a building for veterans inaugurated in Paris in 1679.

Only a ninth of the original design was ever completed. At most, about 1200 inmates lived there. In 1935, all inhabitants moved to another "invalidovna", at Hořice, and the building was used by the Czech army. After this, it was used as an army archive. The building was damaged by a large flood in 2002, and most of the archive materials were destroyed. The building currently awaits an expensive reconstruction. One possible future use is as an open space for culture and social life.

Several scenes from 1984 American drama film Amadeus directed by Miloš Forman were shot in the building.

The metro station Invalidovna is named after this building.

References

Baroque architecture in the Czech Republic
Buildings and structures in Prague
Archives in the Czech Republic
1730s establishments in the Holy Roman Empire